Grounded for Life is an American television sitcom that debuted on January 10, 2001, as a mid-season replacement on Fox. Created by Mike Schiff and Bill Martin, it ran for two seasons on the network until being canceled only two episodes into its third season. It was immediately picked up for the rest of the third season by the WB, where it aired for two additional seasons until the series ended on January 28, 2005.

The show starred Donal Logue and Megyn Price as Sean and Claudia Finnerty, an Irish Catholic couple living on Staten Island, New York, with their three children: Lily (Lynsey Bartilson), Jimmy (Griffin Frazen), and Henry (Jake Burbage). The show also stars Kevin Corrigan, Bret Harrison, and Richard Riehle. The show has featured guest stars such as Ashton Kutcher, Danny Masterson, Mila Kunis, Wilmer Valderrama (cast of That '70s Show), Dave Foley, Kevin McDonald, Scott Thompson (cast of The Kids in the Hall), Mike Vogel, Natasha Lyonne, Vincent Pastore, Miriam Flynn, Stephen Root, and Elizabeth Berridge (Kevin Corrigan's real-life wife).

Premise
The show, set in an Irish-Catholic neighborhood of Staten Island, New York, is about the comedic interplay of the Irish-American Catholic Finnerty family. One of the show's central aspects is that Sean and Claudia Finnerty had their first child and got married when they were 18 years old. Thus, although their most senior is a teenage daughter, the parents are relatively young and not complete with their "wild" years. (In an episode where Sean goes to fetch Lily from the police station and is mistaken for her drug dealer, his father quips, "That's what happens when you're 18 and don't know what a rubber is!") The show features an unusual style of storytelling, often starting with a scene at the end of the story or sometimes in the middle and filling in the gaps with flashbacks. Its main concepts are an Irish/Italian Catholic family with one daughter and two sons, surviving endless catastrophes, and utilizing flashbacks to explain each current situation further.

The opening sequence is set to a guitar theme, performed by the band Ween, that also serves as the music between scenes. The first sequence, used for the first 11 episodes of season 1, showed the family playing basketball. The twelfth episode ("Jimmy Was Kung-Fu Fighting") onwards showed a mix of scenes from Season 1. The sequence was updated each year to include scenes from the current season. The opening sequence was later truncated, as cast names were shown after the sequence, over the episode itself.

Music is essential in the production of the series, as musical cues introduce and conclude flashbacks. Episodes are also named after songs or are a play on song names or lyrics. Each episode has slightly different music in the opening sequence, differing at the end of the sequence.

Two episodes from Season 3, "Oh, What a Knight" and "Part-Time Lover," did not air on primetime, but can be seen in syndication on ABC Family.

Cast and characters

Main cast

Donal Logue and Megyn Price portrayed Sean and Claudia Finnerty, a Staten Island couple who were married and expecting by age 18.  Sean was an electrician in the underground of the New York City Subway, but he later became the owner of a bar with his brother Eddie.  Claudia works as a hostess in a Soho restaurant. Later, when her daughter Lily decides that college isn't for her, Claudia realizes the importance of education and looks into college options for herself, regretting that she couldn't have gone right away after high school.

By their early 30s, Sean and Claudia have three children (later four). Lily (Lynsey Bartilson) is a high school student who can often get overwhelmed by the desire to be popular, although she always comes around at the end of the episode realizing what she has done. When Lily was single, she spent most of her time searching for a boyfriend, often hanging out with her next-door neighbor Brad O'Keefe, whom she later dates. She also dated the drummer of Sean and Eddie's band, Dean Peramotti; they went steady until Lily's birthday when she asked him to tell her something he loves about her, and he couldn't. After Dean leaves, Lily finds Brad sitting outside because his dad locked him out. She tells him what happened, and Brad lists everything he loves about her. This is when Lily realizes that she shouldn't have turned down Brad for so long since he was always in love with her. On several occasions, Lily has been drunk, regretting it the next morning, including a college party at which she bumps into Claudia, and they both promise to keep it from Sean. Lily was shocked to discover she was born before her parents were married but later realized she was proof of their love.

Jimmy (Griffin Frazen), the second Finnerty child and first son, is the family black sheep. Jimmy is closer with his uncle, Eddie, than his father, which upsets his father at times. His choices are not always accepted by his parents, like when he decided to become a vegetarian. Jimmy is smart and wants to do well at school, but his parents sometimes unintentionally seem to hold him back. Once at a street fair, Sean and Claudia go to a Ramones concert, and Jimmy is late with his science project, causing him to be suspended. The following day he went missing and was later discovered to have sneaked back into school. Jimmy has been bullied at school; once, he fought back and was accused of being the bully. He was also briefly bullied by a girl, although it turned out that she liked him.

Henry (Jake Burbage), the Finnertys' younger son, is the family optimist. A little wild, sometimes annoying, and unfortunately gullible, he is kindhearted and gentle. Jake Burbage left the show at the end of season four (in the summer of 2004) to move back east, which is why he was never seen in season five.

Gracie, the youngest Finnerty, was born in the last episode. Claudia discovers she is pregnant at the start of season five, and in the season finale—at Lily's graduation—she goes into labor and delivers Gracie at the hospital. Originally they were going to call her Rose, but when too many people mistakenly thought the name was a reference to Titanic, they decide to rename her Gracie. Walt and his fiancée then say they will name their child Rose.

Eddie (Kevin Corrigan) is Sean's younger brother, a conniving, street-smart eccentric who can often act self-centered but has a good heart. Claudia and Eddie often have their differences throughout the series run. Their most extensive argument was caused when Eddie recorded a porn film in the Finnerty house; Claudia and Sean put him out.

Walt (Richard Riehle) (starring: seasons 1-2, recurring: seasons 3–5) is Sean and Eddie's strict father. He often criticizes Sean and Claudia for being too soft on their kids. Sean and Eddie had a frightening upbringing, as Walt often scared them by telling them that their sins would send them to hell or by giving them booklets that explained what effect sins would have on them. Widower Walt has had little luck with women: He once had a woman whom Sean and Eddie didn't like; Lily and Brad set him up on a date with a woman, or whom they thought was a woman; another handcuffed him in the bar and robbed him.

Brad O'Keefe (Bret Harrison) (recurring: seasons 1–2, starring: seasons 3-5) is the Finnertys' nerdy next-door neighbor. He had an on-off relationship with Lily.  They once broke up when they realized they cheated on each other during a summer of being apart, but they eventually get back together. In one episode, Brad is upset when his parents split up, so the Finnertys decide to celebrate his birthday at their house. Unfortunately, during the party, he discovers that his mother had a fling with Eddie. In the end, his parents reconcile.

Recurring cast
Sister Helen (Miriam Flynn) is the nun and principal at Lily, Jimmy, and Henry's school. She frequently tries to tell Sean and Claudia how to raise their kids, whom she is always berating at school (Lily's skirts are too revealing, Jimmy's hair is too long, etc.). Sean once heard her use the F-word.

Dean Peramotti (Mike Vogel) was the drummer of Sean and Eddie's band. He and Lily date until she leaves him for Brad.

Dan O'Keefe (Floyd Van Buskirk in season 1, Gregory Jbara in all later appearances) is Brad's father. Sean and Dan never get along and are always fighting. He is busted for having an affair when Sean challenges him to a tennis match and then notices that Dan has been useless all the weekend "tennis lessons." Connie discovers this, and they break up. Connie then has a brief fling with Eddie, but she and Dan soon get back together.

Finnerty household
The household that makes for the primary location for the series features exciting background props that refer to the family's interests. Throughout the series, there is a picture of Lou Thesz hanging in the living room and a real-life picture of a young Lynsey Bartilson, who plays Lily in the series. The living room also features a framed and hung vintage baseball bat, a broken guitar (used by Sean in his younger days), and a pair of crucifixes, representing the Catholic religion of the family.

The refrigerator in the kitchen is always changing but prominently features fruit magnets and a sticker resembling a video game developer's logo Rockstar Games. Jimmy's room often changes throughout the series, especially after the Henry character departs from the show. Still, at least one piece of WWE merchandise can be spotted in any given scene in the location. The most notable example is a pillow bearing the WWE logo. However, in the last few season five episodes, the pillow is turned over, hiding the logo. Jimmy's room also features a vintage Indianapolis Speedway poster (dated May 30, 1914), a dartboard, a small basketball hoop and at times featured a "Shonen Jump" poster and posters of bands such as Less Than Jake and Green Day.

Lily's room has a computer, a snowboarding poster, and a scrapbook poster, in addition to other commonplace items that change throughout the series.  In early episodes, she has several signs featuring Justin Timberlake and 'N Sync.

Episodes

Production
Ninety-one complete episodes were produced and aired between 2000 and 2005. However, not all episodes were broadcast in the exact order they were created. The first season originally had 22 episodes, five of which, prior the season finale, were held back by Fox and were included as part of the second season. Seventeen episodes were produced for season two, with the five season one episodes, making it a 22-episode season. Many problems occurred during the production of season three. Nineteen episodes had been produced for season three. With Fox canceling the series and later being picked up by the WB, only 11 episodes aired on Fox; two went unaired, while the additional six were included as part of season four. The two unaired episodes went on to air in syndication, and later included in the third season DVD set. The fourth season originally produced 22 episodes, bringing the season four episode count to 28 with the inclusion of the six leftover season three episodes. Season five produced 13 episodes and was the only season to air all its produced episodes as intended.

Reception

Nielsen Ratings

Awards and nominations
Grounded for Life has been nominated for several Young Artist Awards for best TV comedy choice, best family TV comedy series, best performance by a guest star in a TV comedy series, and best-supporting actor in a comedy or drama series, it has also won a Young Artist Award for supporting young actor in a TV comedy series.  It has also been nominated for an Artios Award, Teen Choice Award, GLAAD Media Award and an Emmy Award.

Syndication

United States
The series aired in syndication on ABC Family on an intermittent basis since 2005, having gone through several timeslot changes during its run on the network. When first aired on ABC Family, the tag scenes were edited out; but when ABC Family re-acquired Grounded for Life, newer prints with the tag scenes are now shown.

On November 16, 2009, MTV began to air the show at random during the week Unlike ABC Family's airings, these airings are the same episodes and are aired more frequently.

In February 2015, all five seasons of the show were added to Netflix for instant play.  They are presented in HD for the first time, as they were only shown in standard definition in their network and cable runs.

LAFF aired reruns of the show from May 2016, until December 31, 2018.

On August 3, 2017, Amazon added all five seasons in HD through its Prime video service through a distribution deal with FilmRise.

International
{| class="wikitable sortable"
! Country !! Channel(s) !! Notes
|-
|  
|  Seven Network, Fox8, The Comedy Channel
| Currently airing on The Comedy Channel.
|-
|  
|  Plug TV
|  In French; currently airing
|-
|  
|  VTM 2
|  In English with Dutch subtitles; currently airing
|-
|  
|  BTV Comedy (the former GTV)
|  Currently airing
|-
|  
|  TV Viisi
|  Goes by the name Perhe Paketissa, meaning "Family in a Package," currently airing in English, with Finnish subtitles
|-
|  
|  France 2, France 4
|  Goes by the name "Parents à tout Prix."
|-  
| 
|  Comedy Central
|  Goes by the name Keine Gnade für Dad, meaning "No Mercy for Dad."
|-  
| 
|  HBO Comedy
|  Currently airing. Goes by the name Sorscsapás család, meaning "Setback Family"
|-
| 
| Fox
| Goes by the name I Finnerty, meaning "The Finnertys"
|-
| 
|  4uTV
|  Goes by the name Keine Gnade für Dad, meaning "No Mercy for Dad."
|-
|  
|  STAR World
|  
|-
|  
|  RTÉ Two
|  Aired up until the show's cancellation in 2005
|-
|  
| HOT3
|  Goes by the name ככה זה בחיים (Kacha Ze BaChayim), meaning "That's How Life Is."
|-
|  
|  Nasa TV
|  Goes by the name Доживотно казн
|-
|  
|  TV Norge
|  Goes by the name Familietrøbbel, meaning "Family Trouble."
|-
|  
|  Comedy Central Extra
|  Currently airing
|-
|  
|  HBO Comedy, POP TV
|  Goes by the name "Sami doma." 
|-
|  
|  HBO Comedy
|  Currently airing; titled "Consemnați pe viață" 
|-
|  
|  HBO Comedy
|  Currently airing
|-
|  
|  HBO Comedy
|  Currently airing
|-
|  
|  TV3TV4 Komedi
|  Aired with the english title "Freaky Finnertys".No longer aired.
|-
|  
|  ComedyMax
|  Currently airing
|-
|  
|  TroubleITV1
|  Trouble closed 1 April 2009; no longer broadcasts on ITV1
|}

Home media
The entire series of Grounded for Life has been released on DVD; Anchor Bay Entertainment originally held distribution rights to the series, releasing all five seasons in individual sets between 2006 and 2007. For the first two seasons, Anchor Bay opted to release in their originally produced episodes of 20 and 17, respectively, as opposed to the original broadcast of 15 and 22 episodes. The new opening credits introduced in the second season still remain intact for the five restored episodes on the Season One set.

The series was acquired by Mill Creek Entertainment in 2011 who released only the first two seasons, both in their original broadcast episodes, before making the series available in it entirety.

The series has also been made available on DVD in the United Kingdom, Australia and Germany, with all episodes consisting of their original broadcast episodes. All releases available contain the two unaired episodes from the third season.

British remake
In 2011, the show was remade by the BBC as In with the Flynns.'' Six episodes were produced for its first season, using stories and scenes from the US series.  A six episode second season used original stories.

References

External links
 
 Carsey-Werner Grounded for Life
 
 
 Grounded for Life at Starpulse

2001 American television series debuts
2005 American television series endings
2000s American sitcoms
English-language television shows
Fiction with unreliable narrators
Fox Broadcasting Company original programming
The WB original programming
American television series revived after cancellation
Irish-American mass media
Staten Island in fiction
Television series about dysfunctional families
Television shows set in Staten Island
Television series by Carsey-Werner Productions